Christian Meyer may refer to:
 Christian Meyer (cyclist) (born 1969), retired track cyclist from Germany
 Christian Meyer (ski jumper) (born 1977), retired Norwegian ski jumper
 Christian Meyer (politician) (born 1975), German politician
 Christian Meyer (footballer) (born 1968), retired German association football player
 Christian Meyer (musicologist) (born 1952), French musicologist

See also
 Christian Meier (disambiguation)
 Christian Mayer (disambiguation)